Luke Paul Matlatarea (born in 1938 in Malmal) was a Papua New Guinean clergyman and bishop for the Roman Catholic Diocese of Bereina. He was appointed bishop in 1988. He died in 1998.

References 

1938 births
1999 deaths
Papua New Guinean Roman Catholic bishops
Roman Catholic bishops of Bereina